The 2010 Geelong Football Club season was the club's 111th season in the Australian Football League (AFL). Geelong finished the regular season in second position on the ladder, with 17 wins and five losses. Geelong then went on to lose its Preliminary final against . As a result, Geelong failed to advance to the Grand Final for the first time in four seasons, as well as failing to defend its 2009 premiership.

Geelong signed up a club record of 40,655 members for the season, and had an average home crowd attendance of 41,475.

Club list

Changes from 2009 list

Additions
 Exchange period (received):
 Promoted rookie:
 Jeremy Laidler

 Father/son selection:
 None
 2009 AFL Draft (26 November 2009):
 Daniel Menzel (Round 1; Overall pick 17; from Central District)
 Mitch Duncan (Round 2; Overall pick 28; from East Perth)
 Allen Christensen (Round 3; Overall pick 40; from Geelong Falcons)
 Nathan Vardy (Round 3; Overall pick 42; from Gippsland Power)
 Josh Cowan (Round 4; Overall pick 56; from North Ballarat Rebels)

 2010 Pre-season Draft (15 December 2009):
 None
 2010 Rookie Draft (15 December 2009):
 Jack Weston (Round 1; Overall pick 21; from Gippsland Power)
 Ben Johnson (Round 2; Overall pick 37; from Geelong (VFL))
 James Podsiadly (Round 3; Overall pick 50; from Geelong (VFL))
 Jesse Stringer (Round 4; Overall pick 61; from Port Adelaide Magpies)

Deletions
 Exchange period (traded):
 Delisted:
 Adam Donohue
 Dan McKenna
 Brodie Moles (from Rookie list)
 Scott Simpson
 Kane Tenace
 Bryn Weadon (from Rookie list)
 Retirements:
 Matthew Egan
 Tom Harley
 David Johnson

Senior list
 Players are listed in alphabetical order by surname, and 2010 statistics are for AFL regular season and finals series matches during the 2010 AFL season only. Career statistics include a player's complete AFL career, which, as a result, means that a player's debut and part or whole of their career statistics may be for another club. Statistics are correct to the end of the 2010 season.

Rookie list
 Players are listed in alphabetical order by surname, and 2010 statistics are for AFL regular season and finals series matches during the 2010 AFL season only. Career statistics include a player's complete AFL career, which, as a result, means that a player's debut and part or whole of their career statistics may be for another club. Statistics are correct to the end of the 2010 season.

 * Nominated rookie (Elevated to senior list during season, eligible for senior selection)

Season summary

Pre-season matches

NAB Cup

NAB Challenge

Regular season

Finals

Teams

Finals

Ladder

Awards and records
 Milestones

 AFL awards

 Club awards

 Records
 Highest number of disposals in a single VFL/AFL match by one club (505 disposals) – Round 14, against .
 Equal-most career wins for Geelong (165 wins; with Sam Newman) – Darren Milburn; Round 21, against .

Season statistics

VFL season

Notes
Key

 H ^ Home match.
 A ^ Away match.

General notes

References

External links
 Official website of the Geelong Football Club
 Official website of the Australian Football League 
 2010 season scores and results at AFL Tables
 2010 Geelong player statistics at AFL Tables

Geelong Football Club
2010
Geelong Football Club